Pedro Reyes de los Ríos de Lamadrid, O.S.B. (2 August 1657 – 6 January 1714) was a Roman Catholic prelate who served as Bishop of Yucatán (1700–1714) and Bishop of Comayagua (1699–1700).

Biography
Pedro Reyes de los Ríos de Lamadrid was born in Seville, Spain on 2 August 1657 and ordained a priest in the Order of Saint Benedict. On 11 April 1699, he was appointed during the papacy of Pope Innocent XII as Bishop of Comayagua. On 28 June 1699, he was consecrated bishop by Giuseppe Archinto, Archbishop of Milan, with Bartolomé de Ocampo y Mata, Bishop of Plasencia, and Francisco Zapata Vera y Morales, Titular Bishop of Dara, serving as co-consecrators. On 30 March 1700, he was appointed during the papacy of Pope Innocent XII as Bishop of Yucatán and installed on 13 October 1700. He served as Bishop of Yucatán until his death on 6 January 1714.

Episcopal succession
While bishop, Lamadrid was the principal consecrator of:
Dionisio Resino y Ormachea, Auxiliary Bishop of Santiago de Cuba (1707)
and the principal co-consecrator of:
Baltasar de Mendoza y Sandoval, Bishop of Segovia (1699).

References

External links and additional sources
 (for Chronology of Bishops) 
 (for Chronology of Bishops) 
 (for Chronology of Bishops) 
 (for Chronology of Bishops) 

17th-century Roman Catholic bishops in Honduras
18th-century Roman Catholic bishops in Honduras
Bishops appointed by Pope Innocent XII
1657 births
1714 deaths
Benedictine bishops
Roman Catholic bishops of Comayagua